Hermann Dyck (4 October 1812 – 25 March 1874), a Bavarian painter, born at Würzburg in 1812, studied architectural and genre painting at Munich. His works are original and of great humour, and are neatly and carefully executed. The satirical designs for the Fliegende Blätter, in reference to the rage for monuments, are incomparable. He was director of the Art Schools at Munich, where he died in 1874.

See also
 Walther von Dyck
 List of German painters

References

External links
 Works by Hermann Dyck at HeidICON

1812 births
1874 deaths
19th-century German painters
19th-century German male artists
German male painters
Artists from Würzburg